Operation Shark was a counter-terrorism operation conducted by the military and police forces of British Mandatory Palestine in response to the King David Hotel bombing. Conducted through a series of house to house searches, the operation was intended to deprive the Irgun organization of manpower, hideouts, and weaponry.

Background 
By 1946 the situation in Palestine had grown increasingly unstable. In response to an increase in insurgent activity, the Mandatory Palestine garrison and police force launched Operation Agatha on 29 June 1946. Checkpoints were set up, trains were flagged down, and workers were escorted home. Special licenses were issued to operators of emergency vehicles. Curfews were imposed and people found in violation of them were detained, with some being imprisoned. The operation uncovered large stockpiles of illicit weapons. In on instance, the entire male population of the town of Yagur was arrested after 300 rifles and 400,000 bullets were discovered in the kibbutz. While the operation was seen as a success by the Mandate, it created a great deal of public unrest and was labeled "Black Saturday" by the general population.

In response to Operation Agatha, the Irgun planted a bomb in the basement of the King David Hotel in Jerusalem, were the Mandate government ran an office. The bomb detonated on 22 July 1946, heavily damaging the building and killing 91 people. The attack triggered worldwide outrage and spurred calls for a crackdown in Palestine.

Operation Shark 
As a result of the King David Hotel attack, the whole of Tel Aviv and sections of Jaffa were cordoned and a house to house search conducted for militants and arms: a huge and unprecedented operation. An outer cordon was put in place before the troops moved up and inner cordons and curfews established in the early morning of 29 July. Plans were made for short periods of food distribution and essential services such as hospitals and utilities were continued under military guard. The process was for all occupants to be assembled in open areas and to have IDs checked. The house would then be searched and all except the elderly, infirm and children screened; suspects and persons of interest were then taken to government buildings for screening by CID officers. Overall, between 500–787 people were arrested in connection with insurgent activities.

Effectiveness 
A wide range of opinions exist as to the effectiveness of Operation Shark. In his memoirs, Irgun leader Menachem Begin, who escaped the cordon by hiding in a secret compartment of his house, declared that the operation had been a costly failure that had bolstered popular support for the insurgency. General Sir Evelyn Barker of the Mandate stated that,

On the other hand, former insurgent Samuel Katz admitted that the operation nabbed,

Aftermath 
The operation was mostly successful in that it stalled major insurgent activity until February 1947. International reactions to the operation were tempered by the fact that it was widely seen as a retaliatory action for the King David Bombing. Operation Shark did foster domestic support for an independent Jewish state and the end of the Mandate of Palestine.

References

External links 
 ParaData: War Diaries
 Britain's Small Wars

Counterterrorism
1946 in Mandatory Palestine
Military operations involving the United Kingdom
Jewish insurgency in Mandatory Palestine